Evergestis pechi is a species of moth in the family Crambidae described by George Thomas Bethune-Baker in 1885. It is found in Spain, on Malta and North Africa, including Algeria.

The wingspan is 30–31 mm. The forewings are greyish-olive brown with white lines and spots. The hindwings are grey with darkly dusted veins and a broad darker margin.

References

Moths described in 1885
Evergestis
Moths of Europe
Moths of Africa